Girish Kasaravalli (born 3 December 1950) is an Indian film director, in the Kannada cinema, and one of the pioneers of the Parallel Cinema. Known internationally for his works, Kasaravalli has garnered fourteen National Film Awards, including four Best Feature Films; Ghatashraddha (1977), Tabarana Kathe (1986), Thaayi Saheba (1997) and Dweepa (2002). In 2011, he was awarded with the Padma Shri, the fourth highest civilian award by Government of India.

A gold medalist from the Film and Television Institute of India, Pune, The film he made to fulfill his diploma, Avashesh, was awarded the Best Student Film and the National Film Award for Best Short Fiction Film for that year. He has received fourteen National Film Awards.

Early life
Girish Kasaravalli was born in Kesalur, a village in the Tirthahalli taluk in Shimoga district on 3 December 1950 to Ganesh Rao, an agriculturist, as well as a freedom fighter, and Lakshmidevi, a homemaker, one of 10 children (five brothers and four sisters). He had his primary education in Kesalur and middle school education in Kammaradi. Hailing from a family of book lovers, he was initiated to reading from a young age by his father. His father was a patron of Yakshagana, a folk system of dance native to Karnataka.

He was attracted to the touring talkies which visited his village once in a while to screen popular Kannada films. This was his first exposure to the world of cinema. Another relative who supported his love for creative arts was his maternal uncle K.V.Subbanna, a Magsaysay award winner who founded Neenasam, a critically acclaimed and popular drama company.

He shifted to Shimoga where he graduated from Sahyadri College. College was transformative for Kasaravalli as poets G S Shivarudrappa and Sa Shi Marulaiah were his Kannada teachers. He then enrolled for the B.Pharma course in the College of Pharmacy, Manipal. The college was a common place for many cultural activities and kept Kasaravalli's creative interests alive. After completing his degree, he went to Hyderabad for training. But, due to his pre-occupations in cinema and art, he found it difficult to manage his profession and interest together. He decided to quit the career in Pharmacy and join the Film and Television Institute of India (FTII), Pune.

Career

Kasaravalli graduated from FTII Pune in 1975, with a specialisation in film direction. The world of Kurosawa, Ray, Ozu, Fellini and Antonioni inspired him, and his conviction in neo-realist cinema deepened. In an interview many years later, he recollected how he was inspired by these filmmakers, especially Ozu. While in his final year, he was chosen to be the assistant director for B. V. Karanth for the film Chomana Dudi. He passed out of the FTII with a gold medal to his credit. His student film Avasesh won the President's Silver Lotus award for the best experimental short film of the year.

His first film as an independent director was Ghatashraddha in 1977; it won him the Golden Lotus and a few international awards. This film was followed by many more masterpieces. For a short while, he served as the principal of a film institute in Bangalore.

He has worked as associate director for T. S. Nagabharana's Grahana movie during 1981
He won his second Golden Lotus for Tabarana Kathe in 1987. Considered one of the best edited films in India, it deals with the futile efforts of a retired government servant to earn his pension. In 1997, he came up with another masterpiece, Thaayi Saheba which won him his third Golden Lotus award. Thaayi Saheba is considered to be the most mature work of the director, dealing with the transition in the Indian society from the pre- to the post-independence periods.

The narrative structure was unique, and it had a powerful way of depicting a social situation. He repeated his success with Dweepa in 2002 starring late actress Soundarya. It won his fourth Golden Lotus award. Dweepa was different from his earlier films: It used music extensively and was visually stunning. Apart from these four films winning Golden Lotus awards, Kasaravalli directed Akramana in 1979, Mooru darigalu in 1981, Bannada Vesha in 1988, Mane in 1990, Kraurya in 1996, Hasina in 2004 and Naayi Neralu in 2006.

Naayi Neralu dealt with a very intense and bizarre concept of reincarnation, based on the novel with the same name by S.L. Bhyrappa. Kasaravalli has given a different interpretation of the subject. It won the Best Film award at KARA film festival, Karachi thus making it the first ever Kannada film to win the top honour in any international festival.

In 2008 he directed Gulabi Talkies based on a short story of the same name by Vaidehi. It was shown in many international film festivals, winning awards and accolades. In 2010, he made Kanasemba Kudureyaneri (Riding the Stallion of Dreams) which, too, won him many international awards. He has finished his Koormavatara (The Tortoise, an Incarnation) which won the National film award for the best Kannada film of 2011. In 2015 he made a  documentary film on Adoor Gopalakrishnan named Images/Reflections.

The International Film Festival of Rotterdam held a retrospective of Kasaravalli's films in 2003. In August 2017, the Entertainment Society of Goa organized a film festival in Goa in his honour.

Personal life
Kasaravalli married actress Vaishali on 21 April 1978. They have two children: son Apoorva and daughter Ananya. Vaishali died of illness in 2010, aged 59.

Kasaravalli is a voracious reader and counts the works of K. Shivaram Karanth, Kuvempu and U. R. Ananthamurthy among his influences.

Awards and international honours

Notable filmography

References

External links

 
 External interview at Rediff on directing Gulabi Talkies
 ಕನ್ನಡಸಾಹಿತ್ಯ.ಕಾಮ್ ನಿಂದ ಗಿರೀಶ್ ಕಾಸರವಳ್ಳಿ ಗೌರವಾರ್ಥ – ಕನ್ನಡ ಪರ್ಯಾಯ ಸಿನಿಮಾ ರಸಗ್ರಹಣ ಶಿಬಿರ
 The Films of Girish Kasaravalli
 Life in Metaphors : A portrait of Girish Kasaravalli

Film and Television Institute of India alumni
1949 births
Living people
Film directors from Karnataka
Kannada film directors
Film producers from Karnataka
People from Shimoga district
Recipients of the Padma Shri in arts
Filmfare Awards South winners
Manipal Academy of Higher Education alumni
20th-century Indian film directors
Kannada screenwriters
21st-century Indian film directors
20th-century Indian dramatists and playwrights
21st-century Indian dramatists and playwrights
Hindi-language film directors
Screenwriters from Karnataka
Best Adapted Screenplay National Film Award winners
Producers who won the Best Feature Film National Film Award
Directors who won the Best Feature Film National Film Award
Directors who won the Best Film on Family Welfare National Film Award